Terrell Claude Chadick (September 21, 1909 – May 23, 2005) was a justice of the Supreme Court of Texas from October 5, 1977 to December 31, 1978.

He was president pro tempore of the Texas Senate during the Fiftieth Texas Legislature.

References

Justices of the Texas Supreme Court
1909 births
2005 deaths
20th-century American judges